The boulevard de la Chapelle marks the border between the 10e arrondissement and the 18e arrondissement of Paris. It corresponds in part to the mur des Fermiers généraux, which, until 1860, marked the border between the communes of Paris and La Chapelle, a commune in its own right on the outskirts of the city.

The street is served by the Paris Metro station La Chapelle.  At number 37 is the Théâtre des Bouffes du Nord.

Chapelle, la
10th arrondissement of Paris
18th arrondissement of Paris